The Tyee Sandstone is a geologic formation in Oregon. It preserves fossils.

See also

 List of fossiliferous stratigraphic units in Oregon
 Paleontology in Oregon

References

External links
 Parke D. Snavely, Jr., Holly C. Wagner, and Norman S. MacLeod: Rhythmic-bedded Eugeosynclinal Deposits of the Tyee Formation, Oregon Coast Range. Kansas Geological Survey 1964.

Geologic formations of Oregon